Yeon Namsaeng (연남생, 淵男生) (634–679) was the eldest son of the Goguryeo Dae Magniji (대막리지, 大莫離支; highest-ranking official or dictator; "prime minister") Yeon Gaesomun (603?-665). In 665, Yeon Namsaeng succeeded his father and became the 2nd Dae Magniji of Goguryeo.

Dae Magniji 
Yeon Namsaeng was said to have become Dae Magniji sometime before the death of Yeon Gaesomun, who is said to have stepped down from the position and took the honorary position of Dae Magniji.

After the death of his father, Yeon Namsaeng prepared for war with the Tang, and set out on an inspection of the border fortresses in Yodong, and other fortresses throughout the kingdom. He left his brothers, Yeon Namgeon and Yeon Namsan, in charge of Pyeongyang before he left. Namgeon and Namsan took advantage of their brother's absence and took control of Pyeongyang and the Royal Courts. They falsely accused Namsaeng of being a traitor, and forced the King Bojang to order Namsaeng's arrest. With nowhere else to go, Namsaeng fled to Tang China at the urge of his son, who had escaped death at the hands of his uncles. Namsaeng fled to the Tang, and received a high position in the Tang military.

Fall of Goguryeo and death 
From there he helped lead a Tang-sponsored military campaign into Goguryeo with hopes of regaining power. This campaign ultimately destroyed Goguryeo in 668. He died in the domains of the Tang-established Protectorate General to Pacify the East, or Andong Duhufu (安東都護府), the Chinese administration established in Pyongyang following the fall of Goguryeo in 668 and meant to administer the former Goguryeo domains. Namsaeng was buried on Mt. Mang in Luoyang, Tang's eastern capital.

Namsaeng's tomb stele, along with that of his brother Namgeon, has been discovered. Namsaeng's biography (Quan Nan Sheng 泉男生傳) appears in the Xin Tangshu (New History of Tang), book 110. The Chinese rendering of Namsaeng's family name is Cheon (泉, Chinese Quan) rather than Yeon (淵), because Yeon (Chinese, Yuan) was the given name of Emperor Gaozu of Tang (Li Yuan 李淵), founder and first emperor of Tang, and taboo to apply to another by Chinese tradition.

In popular culture
 Portrayed by Im Ho in the 2006-2007 KBS TV series Dae Jo Yeong.
 Portrayed by Ahn Jae-mo in 2006-2007 SBS TV series Yeon Gaesomun.
 Portrayed by No Min-woo in the 2013 KBS2 TV series The Blade and Petal.

See also
 Yeon Gaesomun
 Goguryeo
 Andong Dohufu

References

Sources 
 Samguk Sagi
 Old Book of Tang

634 births
679 deaths
Goguryeo people
Military history of Korea
Tang dynasty generals at war against Goguryeo
7th-century heads of government
7th-century Korean people